Two submarines of the United States Navy have been named Barbel, after the barbel, a type of European carp.

 , was a Balao-class submarine commissioned in April 1944 and lost at sea sometime in February 1945.
 , was the lead ship of her class and in service from 1959 to 1989.

Sources

United States Navy ship names